Dixie Blossoms (foaled 2 November 2012) is a Group 1 winning Australian thoroughbred racehorse.

Background
Dixie Blossoms was bred and owned by Alan Osburg, the former owner of Champion stallion Exceed and Excel.

Racing career
Dixie Blossoms was twice the winner of the Angst Stakes and the Guy Walter Stakes.  She achieved success in a Group 1 race for the first time in 7 attempts when successful at the odds of 20/1 in the 2019 Coolmore Classic, winning by a margin of 2.5 lengths.

Pedigree

References 

Australian racehorses
Racehorses bred in Australia
Racehorses trained in Australia
2012 racehorse births